Walter Estes Dellinger III (May 15, 1941 – February 16, 2022) was an American attorney and legal scholar who served as the Douglas B. Maggs Professor of Law at Duke University School of Law. He also led the appellate practice at O'Melveny & Myers in Washington, D.C. and the Harvard Law School's Supreme Court and Appellate Litigation Clinic. He served as Acting United States Solicitor General under the administration of President Bill Clinton, from 1996 to 1997.

Early life and education
Dellinger was born in Charlotte, North Carolina to Grace (Lawning) Dellinger, who worked selling men’s clothing, and Walter Dellinger II, who died at an early age. He earned a Bachelor of Arts degree in political science from the University of North Carolina at Chapel Hill in 1963 and a Juris Doctor from Yale Law School in 1966. He clerked for Justice Hugo Black of the U.S. Supreme Court.

Career 
In 1969, Dellinger became a professor at Duke University School of Law. 

In 1993, he joined the Clinton Administration as Assistant Attorney General in charge of the Office of Legal Counsel. Because of his advocacy for liberal causes, his nomination was filibustered by the two conservative senators from his home state of North Carolina, Jesse Helms and Lauch Faircloth, but Dellinger was ultimately confirmed. 

Dellinger served as the acting United States Solicitor General for the 1996–1997 Term of the Supreme Court. He argued nine cases and won five, including a case defending the president’s line-item veto and two cases defending laws that barred assisted suicide.  

He also appeared as a commentator on This Week, the ABC News Sunday morning program hosted by George Stephanopoulos. 

On March 18, 2008, he unsuccessfully represented the District of Columbia before the United States Supreme Court in District of Columbia v. Heller. The District argued that its Firearms Control Regulations Act of 1975 should not be restricted by the Second Amendment. The ban was overturned by the Supreme Court.

In February 2008, Dellinger represented ExxonMobil in the Supreme Court in Exxon Shipping Co. v. Baker, which addressed whether certain punitive damages are available under federal maritime law. This case relates to the Exxon Valdez oil spill of 1989.

On March 5, 2010, the Washington Post published an op-ed by Dellinger defending Karl Thompson.

In 2010, North Carolina Governor Bev Perdue inducted Dellinger into the Order of the Long Leaf Pine, calling him "North Carolina’s best friend, legally, that we’ve ever had."

In early 2012, with Dellinger representing the defendant in United States v. Antoine Jones, the US Supreme Court overruled the warrantless government use of a GPS device on Jones' Jeep Grand Cherokee. Dellinger said the decision in the drug case was "a signal event in Fourth Amendment history".

Personal life and death
Dellinger and his wife, the former Anne Maxwell, had two sons: Andrew, a poet and professor; and Hampton, a lawyer. Dellinger died from pulmonary fibrosis at his home in Chapel Hill, North Carolina, on February 16, 2022, at the age of 80.

See also 
List of law clerks of the Supreme Court of the United States (Seat 1)

References

External links
Duke Law School biography
Office of the Solicitor General
Harvard Law School Supreme Court and Appellate Litigation Clinic

1941 births
2022 deaths
20th-century American lawyers
21st-century American lawyers
Clinton administration personnel
Deaths from pulmonary fibrosis
Duke University School of Law faculty
Harvard Law School faculty
Law clerks of the Supreme Court of the United States
Lawyers from Charlotte, North Carolina
Lawyers from Washington, D.C.
North Carolina Democrats
North Carolina lawyers
United States Assistant Attorneys General for the Office of Legal Counsel
United States Solicitors General
Yale Law School alumni